Equality; or, A History of Lithconia is a utopian fantasy novel.  It is the first American utopian novel.  The author is unknown, though Donald H. Tuck speculates that it could be Dr. James Reynolds, a zealous liberal crusader.  The novel was originally serialized in 8 parts in the weekly newspaper, The Temple of Reason, beginning in 1802.  It was first published in book form by the Liberal Union in 1837.

Publication history
1802, US, The Temple of Reason, Pub date 15 May 1802, serialized in 8 parts
1837, US, Liberal Union , Pub date 1837, Hardback
1863, US, P. J. Mendum, Pub date 1863, Hardback
1947, US, Prime Press , Pub date 1947, Hardback, 500 copies printed

Notes

References

1837 American novels
1830s fantasy novels
American fantasy novels
Utopian novels
Novels first published in serial form
Works originally published in American newspapers
1802 American novels
Works of unknown authorship